Mighty Atom may refer to:

People

Sports
 Jimmy Wilde, a Welsh boxer
 Sydney Wooderson, an English athlete
 Joe Greenstein, a strongman
 Barbara Buttrick, an English female boxer

Other fields
 Mildred Albert, an American fashion show producer and fashion personality
 Boy Bruce, the Mighty Atom, an early stage name of the British entertainer Bruce Forsyth
 Albert Power (priest), Irish priest, academic and author

Film and television
 "The Mighty Atom" (Thunderbirds), the 14th episode of the first season of the Supermarionation television series Thunderbirds
 Mighty Atom (TV series), a 1959 Japanese Tokusatsu live action TV show
 The Mighty Atom, a 1958 animated film featuring Reddy Kilowatt

Other uses
Mighty Atom (1988 video game), published by Konami
Mighty Atom (1994 video game), published by Banpresto
 Mighty Atom, the original Japanese name for the manga comic series Astro Boy created by Osamu Tezuka
 Mighty Atom Records, a Welsh-based record label
 The Mighty Atom, a novel by Marie Corelli